Yosif Shutev (first name also sometimes transliterated as Iosif) (born 6 February 1986) is a Bulgarian footballer.

Career

Shutev has played for Chernomorets Burgas Sofia, Lokomotiv Stara Zagora, and Shumen. He is also a member of the Bulgaria national indoor football team.

References

1986 births
Living people
Bulgarian footballers
Association football midfielders
Association football forwards
First Professional Football League (Bulgaria) players